Kimbetopsalis simmonsae was an ancient mammal (a multituberculate) which was first discovered in 2015.
It lived about 65.5 million years ago, at least a million years after the non-avian dinosaurs went extinct.

References

Cimolodonts
Paleocene mammals of North America
Fossil taxa described in 2016
Prehistoric mammal genera